McHugh is a common surname of Irish origin. It is an anglicisation of the original Irish Mac Aodha, meaning literally "Son of Aodh". Aodh was a popular male given name in mediaeval Gaelic Ireland. It was traditionally written in English-language documents as Hugh, an unrelated name of Frankish origin.

The first bearers of the surname were the grandsons of Aodh (died 1033), who was son of Ruaidhrí mac Coscraigh, King of South Connacht. The surname's pronunciation in Irish has also given rise to the spelling McGagh (otherwise McGah or McGarr), forms of the surname which are geographically concentrated around the area of Belclare parish in County Galway, the centre of the Clann Cosgraigh territory ruled by the historical McHughs. Other anglicised versions of the surname include Hughes and Hewson.

Notable people bearing this surname include:

Bob McHugh (musician), American pianist and composer
Bob McHugh (footballer) (born 1991), Scottish footballer
Brendan McHugh (born 1990), American swimmer
 Charles McHugh (actor) (1870-1931), American actor
Chris McHugh (born 1964), drummer of Christian rock band White Heart
Collin McHugh (born 1987), American baseball player
Edward McHugh (trade unionist) (1853-1915), Irish Georgist (land reformer), trade unionist, Labour activist and social reformer
Edward McHugh (politician) (1846-1900), Irish nationalist politician, an anti-Parnellite Member of Parliament for South Armagh, 1892–1900
Edward McHugh (artist) (born 1969), Philadelphia artist
Ed McHugh (born 1930), American soccer player
Eoin McHugh (born 1994/5), Irish Gaelic footballer
Francis McHugh (1925-2018), Yorkshire-born Gloucestershire cricketer with the lowest batting average of any regular first-class player
Frank McHugh (1898-1981), American film and television actor
Frazer McHugh (born 1981), English footballer
Gerry McHugh (born 1957), nationalist politician in Northern Ireland
Godfrey McHugh (1911-1997), US Air Force general and aide to President John F. Kennedy
Heather McHugh (born 1948), American poet
James M. McHugh (born 1922), United States Marine Corps officer
James T. McHugh (1932-2000), third bishop of the Roman Catholic Diocese of Rockville Centre
Jason McHugh (born 1968), American television producer and actor
Jeannette McHugh (born 1934), Australian politician
Jimmy McHugh (1894-1969), American composer
Joe McHugh (born 1971), Irish Fine Gael politician
John M. McHugh (born 1948), Irish-American politician
John McHugh (tenor) (1912-2004), British opera singer
Kevin McHugh (born 1980), Irish footballer
Kitty McHugh (1902-1954), American actress
Lia McHugh, American actress
Malachy McHugh (died 1348), canon and Bishop of Elphin and Archbishop of Tuam (1313-1348)
Mark McHugh (born 1990), Irish Gaelic footballer
Matt McHugh (1894-1971), American actor
Matthew F. McHugh (born 1938), politician and US Congressman
Maureen F. McHugh (born 1959), American science fiction and fantasy writer
Michael McHugh (born 1935), justice of the High Court of Australia
Mike McHugh (born 1965), National Hockey League left wing
Paddy McHugh (born 1953), Irish independent politician
Paul McHugh (legal scholar) (born 1958), New Zealand academic lawyer
Paul R. McHugh (born 1931), Massachusetts psychiatrist, educator, author
Ryan McHugh (born 1994), Irish Gaelic footballer
Sean McHugh (born 1982), American football tight end
Siobhán McHugh, Irish-Australian author, podcaster and documentary filmmaker
Terry McHugh (born 1963), Irish javelin thrower
Thomas J. McHugh (1919-2000), recipient of the Purple Heart medal

Fictional characters with this surname include:
 Benji McHugh, in the UK soap opera Family Affairs
 Nathan McHugh, in the American television series Flight 29 Down

See also
 McHugh Forum

References

Given names
Surnames
Surnames of Irish origin
Surnames of English origin
Surnames of British Isles origin
Anglicised Irish-language surnames
English-language surnames